Trite simoni is a jumping spider species in the genus Trite. It was first identified in 2014 by Polish arachnologist Barbara Maria Patoleta.

Description

Distribution
Trite simoni is found on the Loyalty Islands, New Caledonia.

References

Spiders of New Caledonia
Salticidae
Spiders described in 2014